Robert S. Levine is a scholar of American and African American literature. He is currently Distinguished University Professor and Distinguished Scholar-Teacher at the University of Maryland, College Park.

Biography 
Levine received his B.A. from Columbia University in 1975 and his PhD from Stanford University in 1981. His research focuses on 19th-century American literature, especially on the life and works of Frederick Douglass. He sits on the editorial boards of numerous academic journals including American Literary History and Journal of American Studies and serves as General Editor of The Norton Anthology of American Literature.

Works 

 Conspiracy and Romance: Studies in Brockden Brown, Cooper, Hawthorne, and Melville (1989)
 Martin Delany, Frederick Douglass, and the Politics of Representative Identity (1997)
 The Cambridge Companion to Herman Melville, editor (1998)
 Dislocating Race and Nation (2008)
 Frederick Douglass & Herman Melville: Essays in Relation, editor, with Samuel Otter (2008)
 The New Cambridge Companion to Herman Melville, editor (2014)
 The Heroic Slave [a story by Frederick Douglass]: A Cultural and Critical Edition, co-edited with John Stauffer and John R. McKivigan (2015)
 The Lives of Frederick Douglass (2016)
 Race, Transnationalism, and Nineteenth-Century American Literary Studies (2018)
 The Failed Promise: Reconstruction, Frederick Douglass, and the Impeachment of Andrew Johnson (2021) Review

Awards 

 Outstanding Book Award from Choice Reviews magazine in 1997
 2012 National Endowment for the Humanities Senior Fellowship
 2013 Guggenheim Fellowship

 2014 Hubbell Medal for Lifetime Achievement

References 

Columbia College (New York) alumni
Stanford University alumni
University of Maryland, College Park faculty
20th-century American male writers
21st-century American male writers
20th-century American academics
American male non-fiction writers

Living people
Year of birth missing (living people)